Achaammakkuttiyude Achaayan is a 1998 Indian Malayalam film, directed by Rajan P. Dev and starring Rajan P. Dev and Srividya in the lead roles.

Cast
 Rajan P. Dev as Kattungal Anthony
 Srividya as Achamma Anthony	
 Jagadish as Kattungal Johnny
 Kalabhavan Mani as Sunnichen
 Jagathy Sreekumar as Lawrence
 N. F. Varghese as Kozhipalli Avarachan		
 Devan as Dr. John Zecharia
 Chippy as Mareena
 Philomina
 Kuthiravattam Pappu as Kattapana Kuttappan
 Machan Varghese 
 Baiju Ezhupunna as Kozhipalli Peter		
 Tony as Kozhipalli Paulachen
 Reena as Alice Lawrence
 Ramya Sudha

Awards
Kerala State Film Award for Best Dubbing Artist - Sreeja for Chippy

References

External links

1998 films
1990s Malayalam-language films